Shawn Estrada (born April 1, 1985) is an undefeated Mexican American professional boxer in the Super Middleweight division and was a U.S. Olympian at the 2008 Summer Olympics. Estrada ran for the city council in Commerce, California.

Early life
Raised in East Los Angeles, Estrada is the son of former 1968 Mexican Olympic team boxer Juan Estrada and the youngest of 16 siblings. He credits the sport of boxing as the force that kept him out of gangs growing up, 

His father had hoped to travel to the Beijing Olympics, but his failing health kept him home in Maywood. On August 17, 2008, his father died at St. Vincent Medical Center in Los Angeles.

Amateur career
Estrada had an outstanding amateur record of 110-7. He won the 2000 Junior Olympic Championship at age 14 and the 2001 Pan-American Games Gold Medal, beating the top Cuban and Puerto Rican boxers in his weight class and age bracket. However, Estrada’s junior amateur career ended abruptly after his brother was killed in a gang-related shooting. 

In 2007, he lost to Shawn Porter but won the Olympic qualification beating highly touted Danny Jacobs twice. He lost at the first American Olympic qualifier 3:13 to Carlos Góngora but won three bouts at the second qualifier. 

At the World Championships 2007 he defeated Israel's Artur Zlatopolski and then Japan's Ryota Murata, but was upset by Konstantin Buga of Germany 11-11.

Olympic results
At the 2008 Olympics Estrada won against Argentina's Ezequiel Maderna but lost to the eventual gold medalist England's James DeGale 5-11 in his second bout.

Professional career
On November 29, 2008 Shawn made his Pro debut with a first round K.O. of veteran boxer Lawrence Jones. He's had layoffs because of back injuries and then had to undergo surgery for a ruptured tendon in his hand. He is also a member of Team Fight to Walk, which supports America's first clinical stem cell trial, along with other notable fighters such as Boyd Melson, Demetrius Andrade, Steve Cunningham and Deandre Latimore.

Professional record

|- style="margin:0.5em auto; font-size:95%;"
|align="center" colspan=8|14 Wins (12 knockouts), 0 Losses, 0 Draw
|- style="margin:0.5em auto; font-size:95%;"
|align=center style="border-style: none none solid solid; background: #e3e3e3"|Res.
|align=center style="border-style: none none solid solid; background: #e3e3e3"|Record
|align=center style="border-style: none none solid solid; background: #e3e3e3"|Opponent
|align=center style="border-style: none none solid solid; background: #e3e3e3"|Type
|align=center style="border-style: none none solid solid; background: #e3e3e3"|Rd., Time
|align=center style="border-style: none none solid solid; background: #e3e3e3"|Date
|align=center style="border-style: none none solid solid; background: #e3e3e3"|Location
|align=center style="border-style: none none solid solid; background: #e3e3e3"|Notes
|-align=center
|Win || 14-0-0  ||align=left|Terrance Woods
| || 8  || February 17, 2012 ||align=left|College Park Center, Arlington, Texas
|align=left|
|-align=center
|Win|| 13-0-0  ||align=left|Alvaro Enriquez
| || 3 , 0:22 || August 13, 2011 ||align=left|Convention Center, Acapulco, Guerrero, Mexico
|align=left|
|-align=center
|Win || 12-0-0 ||align=left|Byron Tyson	
| || 1 , (1:27) || May 15, 2011 ||align=left|Home Depot Center, Carson, California
|align=left|
|-align=center
|Win || 11-0-0 ||align=left|Jon Schmidt
| || 1 , (1:48) || January 28, 2011 ||align=left|Pechanga Resort & Casino, Temecula, California
|align=left|
|-align=center
|Win || 10-0-0 || align=left|Tony Hirsch
||| 6  || November 8, 2010 || align=left|Corrosion Hangar, Camp Lejuene, North Carolina
|align=left|
|-align=center
|Win || 9-0-0 ||align=left|Nathan Bedwell
||| 1 , (0:28) || October 7, 2010 ||align=left|Tachi Palace Hotel & Casino, Lemoore, California
|align=left|
|-align=center
|Win || 8-0-0 ||align=left|Alex Armenta 
||| 1 , (0:57) || August 13, 2010 ||align=left|Citizens Business Bank Arena, Ontario, California
|align=left|
|-align=center
|Win || 7-0-0 ||align=left|Eddie Hunter
||| 1 , (0:53) || July 23, 2010 ||align=left|Tachi Palace Hotel & Casino, Lemoore, California
|align=left|
|-align=center
|Win || 6-0-0 ||align=left|Cory Jones 
||| 1 , (1:31) || May 16, 2009 ||align=left|Oracle Arena, Oakland, California
|align=left|
|-align=center
|Win || 5-0-0 ||align=left|Nick Runningbear
||| 1 , (3:00) || April 23, 2009 ||align=left|Tachi Palace Hotel & Casino, Lemoore, California
|align=left|
|-align=center
|Win || 4-0-0 ||align=left|Omar Coffi
||| 3 , (0:47) || April 11, 2009 ||align=left|Mandalay Bay Resort & Casino, Las Vegas, Nevada
|align=left|
|-align=center
|Win || 3-0-0 ||align=left|Ray Craig
||| 1 , (1:41) || March 27, 2009 ||align=left|Nokia Theater, Los Angeles, California
|align=left|
|-align=center
|Win || 2-0-0 || align=left|Shaun Spaid
||| 1 , (0:43) || December 13, 2008 ||align=left|Morongo Casino, Resort & Spa, Cabazon, California
|align=left|
|-align=center
|Win || 1-0-0 || align=left|Lawrence Jones
||| 1 , (1:00) || November 29, 2008 ||align=left|Citizens Business Bank Arena, Ontario, California
|align=left|
|-align=center

References

External links
Shawn Estrada Amateur Boxing Record

American boxers of Mexican descent
Boxers at the 2008 Summer Olympics
Middleweight boxers
1985 births
Living people
Olympic boxers of the United States
American male boxers
People from East Los Angeles, California